Russia first participated at the European Youth Olympic Festival at the 1993 Winter Festival and has earned medals at both summer and winter festivals.

Medal tables

Medals by Summer Youth Olympic Festival

Medals by Winter Youth Olympic Festival

See also
Russia at the Youth Olympics
Russia at the Olympics

References

External links
 EYOF – Russian Olympic Committee

European Youth Olympic Festival
Nations at the European Youth Olympic Festival
European Youth Olympic Festival